Lizarte is a Spanish amateur cycling team founded in 1993. From its creation until 2019, Lizarte was the primary team as part of the Asociación Deportiva Galibier organisation. In 2020, a professional team Equipo Kern Pharma was established by the organisation, with Lizarte acting as a feeder team.

Team roster

References

External links
 

Cycling teams based in Spain
Cycling teams established in 1993